Ez Gomér (born September 3, 1962) is a Swedish vocalist, bass player, songwriter and record producer.

Vocalist and bass guitarist, Ez Gomér got his start in the mid-eighties when he joined the Swedish melodic metal band Leviticus in time to perform on its third and finest release Setting Fire to the Earth (1986). In 1987, after some extensive European and American touring with Leviticus and after opening for bands like Uriah Heep, Nazareth and Twisted Sister, Gomér felt it was time to move on. During his tenure in Leviticus, Ez struck up a friendship with the band's lead vocalist Terry Haw which at this time led to the creation of an energetic new group called Jet Circus consisting only of Gomér and Haw. As a live act a drummer was added and showed the band as a trio.

Biography

Creating Hybrid Metal
Gomér wanted to create something fresh and different and told "The whole idea was to dig inside instead of looking at others". Experimenting and having fun was high priority. As a result, the two came up with the creative "hybrid-form" of funky groove-laden hard rock – found on the Sony Epic 1991, US debut release for Jet Circus, Step On It.

Jet Circus landed a rare endorsement deal from Harley-Davidson in time for the American release and created an immediate buzz in the hard rock/metal community as well as amongst critics. When served a sound so different and fresh, they did not even have a name for what they heard. The suggestions were as many as there were critics. Some reported "Elvis meets Cheap Trick" others wrote "Led Zeppelin meets Beastie Boys meets Run DMC". "Jet Circus is what it would sound like if you could plug your guitar into a Harley." Perhaps Derek Oliver of British Kerrang! said it best: "Jet Circus.. is the best band I’ve heard to come out of Scandinavia – this band is brilliant." Jet Circus is groovy music from the heart – all of its own brand.

With the 1991 US radio hit song "Victory Dance", Jet Circus were amongst the first to experiment with metal and rap, which later on led them to be mentioned in the media as grandfathers for bands like Limp Bizkit and Linkin Park. Ez Gomér replied: "That’s fine with me as long as I don’t have to retire".

In time for their first US tour, Jet Circus went No1 on the CCM radio chart with "Break This Jail" and were airplayed somewhere in the States every twenty minutes for almost a year with songs like "Victory Dance", "Rockin Horse", "Jet Blue", "Step On It" and "Break This Jail" – which also went on to be “Metal song of the year” on CCM.

Following a tour of the U.S that same year, Ez and Terry Haw began writing and recording the material that would make up Jet Circus' sophomore effort – No Mercy For The Living Dead, but with never ending hazzle with the record company, this album project is still unfinished. No Mercy For The Living Dead was recorded 1992–93 and 2004.

Terry Haw who, since 1993, showed less interest in the band left the band finally in 2003, leaving Gomér to be the sole member of Jet Circus.

After the American Sony Epic debut, Jet Circus have since then released albums in Japan (Virgin/All Fired Up) South America – Brazil, Argentina, Puerto Rico, Peru, Europe – Scandinavia, England, Germany, Belgium, Netherlands, Italy, Spain and sold approximately half a million albums.

From 1993 to 2004, Gomér recorded with bands and artists such as: Mikkey Dee (Motorhead, Dokken), Tony Carey (Rainbow), Stephen Pearcy (Ratt), BB Cunningham (Jerry Lee Lewis), James Lott (Carl Perkins, Johnny Cash), Sayit, (Tony Franklin, Richard Marx), Tommy Denander (Toto, Paul Stanley, Radioactive), Jani Stefanovic (Divinefire, Miseration) Pete Pritchard (Scotty Moore, Eric Clapton).

Gomér runs his studio Hypersonic Studios and advertising agency in the heart of Gothenburg, Sweden and has been working as a lecturer at the University of Skövde, teaching entrepreneurship and song writing.

Discography 

Jet Circus – Step On It
Jet Circus – No Mercy for the Living Dead
Jet Circus – Look at Death Now
Jet Circus – Dance Or Die
Leviticus – Setting Fire to the Earth
Veni Domine – Tongues
Contamination – Paradoxx Remixed
Templar – Witch Hunt
Liberty ´N Justice – Soundtrack Of a Soul
Liberty ‘N Justice – Independence Day
Shaboom – The Race Is On
The Royal Years – Compilation
Motion Factory – Compilation
Royal at its Best – Compilation
Heavens Metal Collection 1 – Compilation
Righteous Metal II – Compilation
Ez Gomér Vegas Overdose (Work in progress)

Sources:
Angelic Warlord, Kerrang, Bridefan, No Life Til metal, Rad Rockers, Phantom Tollbooth, Freewebs, Cross Rhythms, CCM

References

Swedish male musicians
Living people
1962 births
Academic staff of the University of Skövde